This is a list of public art in Whitehall, a district in the City of Westminster, London.

Whitehall is at the centre of the highest concentration of memorials in the City of Westminster, in which 47% of the total number of such works in the borough are located. It includes the eponymous street of Whitehall and Horse Guards Parade, both important ceremonial spaces, and Horse Guards Road, which forms its western boundary with St James's Park. The area's monuments are mainly military in character, foremost among them being the Cenotaph, which is the focal point of the national Remembrance Sunday commemorations held each year.



Foreign and Commonwealth Office

Old War Office Building

See also
 Equestrian statue of Charles I, Charing Cross, which faces down Whitehall

References

Bibliography

 

 

 

 

 

 

 

 

 

Whitehall
Public art